Miyar or Miyyaru is a village in the southern state of Karnataka, India. It is located in the Karkala taluk of Udupi district in Karnataka.
Distance from town = 6–7 km.

Demographics
As of 2001 India census, Miyar had a population of 6659 with 3174 males and 3485 females.

See also
 Udupi
 Districts of Karnataka

References

External links
 http://Udupi.nic.in/

Villages in Udupi district